Jan Fuglset (born 1 October 1945) is a Norwegian former professional football player. Fuglset is known as one of the leading goal-scorers in the Norwegian top division with 109 goals from 1967–1982. He is the brother of Tor Fuglset.

Club career
Fuglset started his career in his hometown club Molde FK. From 1967 to 1972 he played for Fredrikstad FK, while he took a teacher-education in Halden. In 1971 he became top goal scorer in the First Division with 17 goals. In 93 first tier matches for Fredrikstad, he scored 52 goals.

In 1973, he was back in Molde, and played for Molde FK until he retired from football in 1982. In the final game of the 1976 league season, he scored all goals in a 6–0 drubbing of Strømsgodset IF, which saved his club from relegation, and relegated the opposition instead. Six goals in one game is still, as of 2019, a joint record for the Norwegian top division that Fuglset share with Odd Iversen. The six goals made him top goal scorer in 1976 with 17 goals. He became top scorer in the top division for Fredrikstad in 1971 and for Molde in 1976 and is, alongside Thorstein Helstad, Odd Iversen, Frode Johnsen one of only four players who have become top scorer in the Norwegian top flight with two different clubs.

Career statistics

International career
Jan Fuglset was capped 20 times for Norway and scored six international goals. He made his debut against Finland on 17 June 1970.
His first two international goals came in his third match in an international friendly against Iceland on 26 May 1971, a game Norway won 3-1.
His last international appearance was against Yugoslavia on 30 October 1974.

International goals
Scores and results list Norway's goal tally first.

Source:

Coaching career
Fuglset served as a player-coach in 1976, and was the head coach of Molde in two periods.

Honours

As player
Fredrikstad
Norwegian Cup: Runner-up 1969, Runner-up 1971

Individual
Norwegian top division top scorer: 1971, 1976

As coach
Molde
Norwegian Cup: Runner-up 1982

References

External links

Living people
1945 births
People from Molde
Molde FK players
Fredrikstad FK players
Norwegian footballers
Norway international footballers
Eliteserien players
Norwegian First Division players
Norwegian football managers
Molde FK managers
Association football forwards
Sportspeople from Møre og Romsdal